Gagitodes sagittata, the marsh carpet, is a moth of the family Geometridae. The species was first described by Johan Christian Fabricius in 1787. It is found in eastern Asia, including Japan, Korea and China and in central and northern Europe. It is sometimes included in the genus  Perizoma

The wingspan is 26–34 mm. The moth flies from June to August depending on the location.

The larvae feed on Thalictrum species.

References

External links

Marsh Carpet at UKMoths

Fauna Europaea
Lepiforum e.V.
Schmetterlinge-Deutschlands.de 

Moths described in 1787
Perizomini
Moths of Asia
Moths of Europe
Taxa named by Johan Christian Fabricius